Douglas Charles Marrone (born July 25, 1964) is an American football coach and former offensive lineman who is the offensive line coach for the New Orleans Saints of the National Football League (NFL). He came to prominence as the head coach at Syracuse from 2009 to 2012, where he previously played college football. He also served as the head coach of the NFL's Buffalo Bills from 2013 to 2014 and the Jacksonville Jaguars from 2016 to 2020.

Marrone won the Pinstripe Bowl twice with Syracuse, which led to him being hired as the Bills' head coach. He helped the Bills obtain their first winning record for a decade during the 2014 season, but opted-out of his contract the same year. Joining the Jaguars in 2015 as an assistant coach, he was named interim head coach near the end of the 2016 season and officially became head coach for 2017. His 2017 campaign was his most successful, leading the Jaguars to their first playoff appearance since 2007 and their first division title since 1999 en route to an AFC Championship Game appearance. However, Marrone's subsequent seasons saw the team finish at the bottom of their division and he was fired in 2020 after a franchise-worst 1–15 record. Marrone returned to college football before being hired by the Saints in 2022.

Playing career
Marrone was born in the Bronx. He is of Italian ancestry. Marrone was a three-year letterman at Syracuse University, playing from 1983 to 1985 on the offensive line; he returned to graduate from the university in 1991.

Marrone was drafted in the sixth round of the 1986 NFL draft by the Los Angeles Raiders, but failed to make the 53-man roster. In the 1987 season, Marrone landed a spot on the roster of the Miami Dolphins, seeing action in four games.

In subsequent years, Marrone spent time in camp with the New Orleans Saints, Pittsburgh Steelers, Dallas Cowboys, and Minnesota Vikings — managing to land on a roster and see action in only one more NFL game, playing for the Saints in 1989. In all, Marrone would be cut six times by NFL teams.

Marrone ended his playing career taking the field in 1991 and 1992 with the London Monarchs of the World League of American Football, helping to win the World Bowl for the Monarchs in 1991.

Coaching career

Syracuse University
On December 11, 2008, after the 2008 season, Marrone was chosen as Syracuse University's head football coach by athletic director Daryl Gross. He was the first Syracuse alumnus to serve as head football coach since Reaves H. Baysinger in 1948. Before being hired at Syracuse, Marrone served as an assistant coach for numerous universities and NFL teams starting in 1992, including a stint with the New Orleans Saints as an offensive coordinator from 2006 to 2008.

Reportedly, alumni such as Tim Green and Floyd Little wanted Marrone from the moment the previous coach, Greg Robinson, was fired. When Marrone was interviewed by Green, it was learned that Marrone had kept a folder of current high school players in the Syracuse area to get a head start in recruiting.

2009
In Marrone's first season, the Syracuse Orange finished with four wins, one more than the previous year.

2010
The Orange doubled that output the following season. The eight wins in 2010 were the most since 2001 for the Orange. The 2010 season was highlighted with a victory over Kansas State and a victory in the first ever Pinstripe Bowl in New York City. This was the Orange's first bowl win since 2001.

2011
In 2011, the team started 5–2, which included a win over then No. 11 West Virginia. After the 5–2 start, the Orange failed to win another game in the season, ending with a 5–7 record.

2012
In 2012, Marrone coached the Orange to an 8–5 record, and a share of the Big East title as the result of a four-way tie. Their 38–14 victory in the Pinstripe Bowl again came against West Virginia.

Buffalo Bills
On January 6, 2013, Marrone was chosen to succeed Chan Gailey as head coach of the Buffalo Bills. His overall record during his two seasons as head coach of the Bills was 15–17. During his Bills' tenure, Marrone nicknamed himself "Saint Doug," referring to the fact that it takes two miracles to be canonized as a saint (he believed winning at Syracuse was one miracle and winning at Buffalo would qualify as the other).

In 2014, the Bills finished with a record of 9–7, second place in the AFC East and two wins away from making the playoffs. This was the Bills' first winning season in ten years (when the Bills finished 9–7 under Mike Mularkey in 2004). At the end of the 2014 season, it was revealed that Marrone had a three-day "out" clause in his contract in the event of an ownership change; the clause was triggered by the sale of the Bills in 2014 after the death of the Bills' founder and long-time owner Ralph Wilson. Marrone exercised the out clause and quit on December 31, 2014, and still collected his 2015 salary in full. After Marrone quit, several players expressed their displeasure and disgust with both the decision and the way that he informed the team. One of the captains and the longest-tenured player on the team, running back Fred Jackson, said it was "like getting punched in the stomach." Marrone interviewed with the New York Jets for their head coaching position; his interview reportedly did not go well.

Jacksonville Jaguars
Following Marrone's two-year stint as the head coach for the Buffalo Bills, the Jacksonville Jaguars hired Marrone as assistant head coach and offensive line coach on January 20, 2015.

On December 19, 2016, Marrone was named the interim head coach of the Jaguars following the firing of former head coach Gus Bradley. He coached the final two games of the 2016 season. On January 9, 2017, the Jaguars officially removed the interim tag and named Marrone the fifth head coach in team history. That same day, the Jaguars also announced the return of former head coach Tom Coughlin, the franchise's first head coach from 1995 to 2002, who was hired as the Executive Vice President of Football Operations, a position he held until the 2019 season.

In 2017, the Jaguars won the AFC South division championship, making the playoffs for the first time since the 2007 season. On January 7, 2018, the Jaguars won their first playoff game under Marrone, defeating the Buffalo Bills in the Wild Card Round, 10–3. They upset the Pittsburgh Steelers in the Divisional Round, advancing to the AFC Championship Game, where they were defeated by the New England Patriots by a score of 24–20.

On February 23, 2018, the Jaguars extended his contract through 2021.

On December 31, 2019, Jaguars owner Shahid Khan announced that Marrone would be retained for the 2020 season, despite back to back losing seasons since making it to the AFC Championship in 2017. general manager David Caldwell was also retained by Khan.

On January 4, 2021, Jaguars owner Shahid Khan announced that Marrone would not be retained for the 2021 season and was fired.

Alabama
On January 19, 2021, Marrone was named the offensive line coach at the University of Alabama under head coach Nick Saban.

On February 1, 2022, It was reported that Eric Wolford has accepted the position of Offensive Line Coach at Alabama. It is unclear whether Doug Marrone was fired or asked to resign from Alabama.

Return to the New Orleans Saints
On February 9, 2022, Marrone was hired as the offensive line coach for the New Orleans Saints under new head coach Dennis Allen. This is Marrone's first stint with the Saints in 14 years, as he previously served as their offensive coordinator under former head coach Sean Payton from 2006-2008.

Head coaching record

College

NFL

* – Interim head coach

References

External links
 Alabama profile

1964 births
Living people
American football offensive linemen
Alabama Crimson Tide football coaches
Buffalo Bills coaches
Buffalo Bills head coaches
Coast Guard Bears football coaches
Cortland Red Dragons football coaches
Georgia Tech Yellow Jackets football coaches
Georgia Bulldogs football coaches
Jacksonville Jaguars coaches
Jacksonville Jaguars head coaches
London Monarchs players
Miami Dolphins players
National Football League offensive coordinators
New Orleans Saints coaches
New Orleans Saints players
New York Jets coaches
Northeastern Huskies football coaches
Syracuse Orange football coaches
Syracuse Orange football players
Tennessee Volunteers football coaches
Sportspeople from the Bronx
Players of American football from New York City
Coaches of American football from New York (state)
American people of Italian descent